The World's Billionaires 2012 edition was 26th annual ranking of The World's Billionaires by Forbes magazine.  The list estimated the net worth of the world's richest people, excluding royalty and dictators, as of February 14, 2012.  It was released online on March 7, 2012.

Annual list
Telecommunications mogul Carlos Slim topped the 2012 list, marking this third consecutive year at the top. Microsoft founder Bill Gates placed second, but narrowed the gap from 2011 as Slim's fortune fell $5 billion while Gates' rose $5 billion. Investor Warren Buffett remained in third place. Bernard Arnault of France was the top-ranking European on the list, placing fourth.  Amancio Ortega moved up a spot to number five, despite stepping down from Zara's top post during the year.   Ricardo Salinas Pliego was the greatest gainer in terms of dollars, adding $9.2 billion to his fortune and moving up to number 37 overall.  Facebook's Mark Zuckerberg was also among the top gainers, adding $4 billion to his fortune.  Dustin Moskovitz, also of Facebook, was the youngest self-made billionaire on the list at age 27.  Making her debut on the list at age 41, Spanx founder Sara Blakely became the youngest self-made female billionaire ever.  Colombia's Alejandro Santo Domingo was the highest ranked newcomer, inheriting a $9.5 billion stake in Santo Domingo Group from his father.  Laurene Powell Jobs, widow of Steve Jobs, was just behind Domingo, inheriting a fortune of $9 billion.

India's Lakshmi Mittal was the largest loser as his fortune dropped from $31.1 billion to $20.7 billion as the price of steel maker ArcelorMittal fell sharply.  As a result, he failed to make the top 10 for the first time since 2004 and lost his title of richest Asian.  Hong Kong's Li Ka-shing reclaimed that title, despite a slight drop in his own wealth.  Harry Potter author JK Rowling and former Research In Motion CEO Jim Balsillie were among whose who fell off the list.

A record total of 1,226 people made the 2012 list, representing 58 different countries.  Of those, 126 were newcomers to the list and 104 were women. The United States had the greatest number of billionaires with 425.  Russia had 96 people on the list, while China had 95.  Three new billionaires from Morocco represented their nation, which did not have any billionaire in 2011.  Georgia and Peru also were newly represented.  Moscow was the home to the most billionaire with 78, followed by New York City with 58, and London with 39.  Falling stock prices in Asia contributed to 117 former billionaires falling from the list worldwide.  Twelve others listed in 2011 died.

Combined net worth of the billionaire list rose to a record $4.6 trillion.  However, net gainers (460) barely outnumbered net losers (441, including 7 of the top 20).  The list average was a net worth of $3.7 billion.

To coincide with the release of the 2012 list, Forbes announced a new "Billionaire Real-Time Ticker" updating the wealth of the world's top fifty billionaires in real time.

Top 10

Top 100

See also
 List of wealthiest families

References

External links
Forbes World's Billionaires 2012

Forbes lists
Lists of people by magazine appearance
2012 in economics